This is a list of cis-regulatory RNAs. These are RNA motifs which regulate nucleic acid regions on the same molecule, as opposed to trans-acting motifs which regulate a distal molecule. Some of these RNAs are broadly distributed while others are single RNA families.

#
 23S methyl RNA motif
 6C RNA

A
Actino-pnp RNA motif
AdoCbl riboswitch
Alfalfa mosaic virus coat protein binding (CPB) RNA
Alfalfa mosaic virus RNA 1 5′ UTR stem-loop
Alpha operon ribosome binding site
Antizyme RNA frameshifting stimulation element
APC internal ribosome entry site (IRES)
Aphthovirus internal ribosome entry site (IRES)
Apolipoprotein B (apoB) 5′ UTR cis-regulatory element
AtoC RNA motif
ATPC RNA motif
AU-rich element

B
Bag-1 internal ribosome entry site (IRES)
Bamboo mosaic potexvirus (BaMV) cis-regulatory element
Bamboo mosaic virus satellite RNA cis-regulatory element
Bovine leukaemia virus RNA packaging signal

C
Citrus tristeza virus replication signal
CrcB RNA motif
Ctgf/hcs24 CAESAR
Cap-independent translation element

E
Enterobacteria greA leader
Enterobacteria rnk leader
Enteroviral 3′ UTR element
Enterovirus 5′ cloverleaf cis-acting replication element
Enterovirus cis-acting replication element

F
FIE3 (ftz instability element 3′) element
Flavivirus capsid hairpin cHP
Flg-Rhizobiales RNA motif

G
G-CSF factor stem-loop destabilising element
Gammaproteobacteria rimP leader

H
Heat shock protein 70 (Hsp70) internal ribosome entry site (IRES)
Hepatitis C alternative reading frame stem-loop
Hepatitis C stem-loop IV
Hepatitis C virus (HCV) cis-acting replication element (CRE)
Hepatitis C virus 3'X element
Hepatitis C virus stem-loop VII
Hepatitis E virus cis-reactive element
HIV gag stem loop 3 (GSL3)
HopC RNA motif
Human parechovirus 1 (HPeV1) cis regulatory element (CRE)
Human rhinovirus internal cis-acting regulatory element (CRE)

I
IbpB thermometer
Infectious bronchitis virus D-RNA

J
JUMPstart RNA motif

L
Luteovirus cap-independent translation element (BTE)

M
Magnesium responsive RNA element
Mason-Pfizer monkey virus packaging signal
Mnt IRES
MraW RNA motif

N
N-myc IRES
Nanos 3′ UTR translation control element

P
P27 cis-regulatory element
Potassium channel RNA editing signal
Potato virus X cis-acting regulatory element
PotC RNA motif
Poxvirus AX element late mRNA cis-regulatory element
Prion pseudoknot
Pseudomonas rnk leader
Pseudomonas rpsL leader
PyrG leader
PyrR binding site

R
R2 RNA element
RbcL 5′ UTR RNA stabilising element
Red clover necrotic mosaic virus translation enhancer elements
Regulatory region of repZ gene
Retrovirus direct repeat 1 (dr1)
Ribosomal protein L10 leader
Ribosomal protein L13 leader
Ribosomal protein L19 leader
Ribosomal protein L20 leader
Ribosomal protein L21 leader
Ribosomal S15 leader
RNase E 5′ UTR element
RncO
Rne-II RNA motif
Rotavirus cis-acting replication element (CRE)
Rous sarcoma virus (RSV) primer binding site (PBS)
RtT RNA
Rubella virus 3′ cis-acting element

S
S-element
SerC leader
Simian virus 40 late polyadenylation signal (SVLPA)
SpeF leader
Spi-1 (PU.1) 5′ UTR regulatory element
Sxy 5′ UTR element

T
T-box leader
Togavirus 5′ plus strand cis-regulatory element
Tombusvirus 3′ UTR region IV
Tombusvirus 5′ UTR
Tombusvirus internal replication element (IRE)
Tobamovirus IRES
Transfer RNA-like structures
TrkB IRES
Turnip crinkle virus (TCV) core promoter hairpin (Pr)
Turnip crinkle virus (TCV) repressor of minus strand synthesis H5

U
U1A polyadenylation inhibition element (PIE)
UnaL2 LINE 3′ element

V
Vimentin 3′ UTR protein-binding region
Voltage-gated potassium-channel Kv1.4 IRES

W
Wingless localisation element 3 (WLE3)

Y
YbhL leader
YdaO/yuaA leader
YkkC-yxkD leader
YybP-ykoY leader

See also
List of RNAs

Cis-regulatory RNA elements
RNA